Berguer is a surname. Notable people with the surname include:

David Berguer (born 1939), British local historian and author
Ramon Berguer, American professor of vascular surgery

See also
Berger